The 1873 Atlantic hurricane season was quiet, with only two tropical storms and three hurricanes, two of which were major hurricanes (Category 3+), being recorded. However, in the absence of modern satellite and other remote-sensing technologies, only storms that affected populated land areas or encountered ships at sea were recorded, so the actual total could be higher. An undercount bias of zero to six tropical cyclones per year between 1851 and 1885 and zero to four per year between 1886 and 1910 has been estimated. Of the known cyclones, large alterations were made to the tracks of Hurricane Two and Hurricane Five in 1995 by Jose Fernandez-Partagas and Henry Diaz, who also proposed smaller changes to the known track of Hurricane Three. All of the tropical cyclones, other than Hurricane Two, made landfall in Florida.


Season summary 
The Atlantic hurricane database, HURDAT, recognizes five tropical cyclones for the 1873 season. Three storms attained hurricane status, with winds of 75 mph (119 km/h) or greater. The second and fifth hurricanes of the season were the most intense, with maximum sustained winds up to 120 mph (190 km/h). The first storm of the season was a tropical storm that developed near the Bahamas on June 1 and made landfall near the Florida/Georgia border the next day before dissipating. The most notable storm of the season was Hurricane Two. It formed as a tropical storm on August 13 in the Atlantic and became a hurricane on August 17. It made landfall at Newfoundland on August 26 and became extratropical the next day. The hurricane caused a great deal of damage and great loss of life. Hurricane Three was first seen in the Gulf of Mexico on September 18. It struck Florida the next day and passed over Georgia and South Carolina before dissipating on September 20. The second tropical storm of the season traveled from the Gulf of Mexico across Florida between September 22 and September 24. The final hurricane of the season formed in the eastern Caribbean on September 26 before reaching Haiti. It weakened and restrengthened to a major hurricane before hitting Florida on October 7. The storm became extratropical on October 9 and dissipated the next day.

Timeline

Systems

Tropical Storm One 

The first storm of the season developed on June 1 over the western Bahamas. It moved northward before turning and striking near the Florida/Georgia border on June 2. The storm quickly dissipated. It produced 28 mph (45 km/h) wind gusts in Jacksonville, Florida.

Hurricane Two 

On August 13, a tropical storm formed in the Atlantic. It followed the track of a Cape Verde hurricane, becoming a hurricane on August 17. It recurved to the north and northeast as it was reaching its peak of 115 mph (185 km/h). As it passed to the south of Nova Scotia, it slowed down and drifted towards the coast of Newfoundland. The hurricane was able to retain hurricane strength, and made landfall on Newfoundland on August 26, and became extratropical the next day. Despite its relatively low maximum winds, the Nova Scotia Cyclone was a deadly storm.

Also known as "The Lord's Day Gale" and "The Great Nova Scotia Hurricane of 1873," it destroyed 1200 boats and 900 buildings in Nova Scotia, and killed at least 223 people, mostly sailors who were lost at sea. This number is disputed, as The Monthly Weather Review, published by the Weather Service, set the death toll at 223 but The New York Times published a death toll of 600. The hurricane caused $3.5 million in damage (1873 US dollars, or $53.9 million in 2005 dollars). During this hurricane, the first hurricane warning was issued between Cape May, New Jersey and New London, Connecticut.

Hurricane Three 

A hurricane was first observed in the central Gulf of Mexico on September 18.It moved quickly northeastward, striking St. Marks, Florida on September 19, There, it produced heavy damage. Later, it weakened to tropical storm as it crossed over Georgia and South Carolina, although it briefly regained hurricane status before last being observed late on September 20.

Tropical Storm Four 

A few days after the previous storm, another storm was observed in the eastern Gulf of Mexico on September 22. It moved across Florida the next day, and was last observed on September 24.

Hurricane Five 

The Central Florida Hurricane of 1873

A tropical storm was first seen in the eastern Caribbean on September 26. It moved northwestward, hitting Haiti as a 115 mph (185 km/h) hurricane. It turned westward as a minimal tropical storm, but as it crossed the Yucatán Channel, it restrengthened, becoming a major hurricane again before hitting southwest Florida on October 7. The hurricane became extratropical on October 9 before dissipating the next day. The hurricane generated a 14-foot storm tide at Punta Rassa, Florida. The hurricane caused 26 deaths with the loss of a ship, the Maisi and may also have caused a schooner, the Maine, with 16 on board, to be lost.

See also 

 1870-1879 Atlantic hurricane seasons
 Tropical cyclone observation
 Atlantic hurricane reanalysis project

References 

 
Articles which contain graphical timelines
Atlantic
Atlantic